Anosiarivo Manapa is a town and commune in Madagascar. It belongs to the district of Betafo, which is a part of Vakinankaratra Region. The population of the commune was estimated to be approximately 17,423 in 2018.

Primary and junior level secondary education are available in town. The majority 98% of the population of the commune are farmers, while an additional 2% receives their livelihood from raising livestock. The most important crop is rice, while other important products are beans and cassava.

7 fokontany (villages) are part of the commune: Soafierenana, Anosiarivo-Ambatofotsy, Ambohimandroso, Antsetsindrano, Bemasoandro, Antanimenana and Anosiarivo Manapa.

Ethnics
The commune is principally inhabited by Merina (75%) and Betsileo (25%).

References and notes 

Populated places in Vakinankaratra